Nyctimantis galeata is a species of frog in the family Hylidae. It is endemic to Brazil and only known from its type locality near Morro do Chapéu, Bahia, in the northern part of the Espinhaço Mountains. The specific name galeata is derived from Latin and means "covered with a helmet", in reference to the co-ossified head of this frog.

Description
The body is robust. The head is depressed and longer than it is wide; the snout is long. The tympanum is distinct, as is the small supratympanic fold. The fingers and toes have small discs; the fingers have no webbing while the toes are partially webbed. Dorsal skin is smooth. The dorsal color pattern consists of longitudinal stripes: two parallel dark-brown dorsal stripes, mottled with cream dots, run from the head to the inguinal region, parallel with one mid-dorsal stripe and a pair of dorsolateral stripes of cream to bronze color.

Habitat and conservation
The type series was found inside a terrestrial tank bromeliad Hohenbergia vertita. The plant cover represented a mosaic of caatinga, cerrado, and campos rupestres vegetation.

As of January 2022, this species has not yet been included in the IUCN Red List of Threatened Species.

References

Frogs of South America
Amphibians of Brazil
Endemic fauna of Brazil
Amphibians described in 2012